Mitotane, sold under the brand name Lysodren, is a steroidogenesis inhibitor and cytostatic antineoplastic medication which is used in the treatment of adrenocortical carcinoma and Cushing's syndrome.

Medical uses
Mitotane has been produced by Bristol Myers Squibb but it is marketed as an orphan drug for adrenocortical carcinoma due to the small number of patients in need of it. Its main use is in those patients who have persistent disease despite surgical resection, those who are not surgical candidates, or those who have metastatic disease. In a 2007 retrospective study of 177 patients from 1985 to 2005 showed a significant increase in the recurrence-free interval after radical surgery followed by mitotane when compared to surgery alone. The drug is also sometimes used in the treatment of Cushing's syndrome.

Side effects
The use of mitotane is unfortunately limited by side effects, which, as reported by Schteinberg et al., include anorexia and nausea (88%), diarrhea (38%), vomiting  (23%), decreased memory and ability to concentrate (50%), rash (23%), gynecomastia (50%), arthralgia (19%), and leukopenia (7%).

Pharmacology

Pharmacodynamics
Mitotane is an inhibitor of the adrenal cortex. It acts as an inhibitor of cholesterol side-chain cleavage enzyme (P450scc, CYP11A1), and also of 11β-hydroxylase (CYP11B1), 18-hydroxylase (aldosterone synthase, CYP11B2), and 3β-hydroxysteroid dehydrogenase (3β-HSD) to a lesser extent. In addition, mitotane has direct and selective cytotoxic effects on the adrenal cortex, via an unknown mechanism, and thereby induces permanent adrenal atrophy similarly to DDD.

Chemistry
Analogues of mitotane include aminoglutethimide, amphenone B, and metyrapone.

History
Mitotane was introduced in 1960 for the treatment of adrenocortical carcinoma.

Society and culture

Generic names

Brand names
Mitotane has been sold under the brand name Lysodren.

Veterinary use
Mitotane is also used to treat Cushing's disease (pituitary-dependent Cushing's syndrome) in dogs. The medication is used in the controlled destruction of adrenal tissue, leading to a decrease in cortisol production.

References

External links
 
 Government of Canada: Benzene, 1-chloro-2-[2,2-dichloro-1-(4-chlorophenyl)ethyl]- (Mitotane)
 Environment Canada & Health Canada: RISK MANAGEMENT SCOPE for Benzene, 1-chloro-2-[2,2-dichloro-1-(4-chlorophenyl)ethyl]- (Mitotane), 2013

3β-Hydroxysteroid dehydrogenase inhibitors
11β-Hydroxylase inhibitors
Aldosterone synthase inhibitors
Antiglucocorticoids
Antineoplastic drugs
Chloroarenes
Cholesterol side-chain cleavage enzyme inhibitors
CYP3A4 inducers
Organochlorides
Orphan drugs